Adolfo Mazzini (1 September 1909 – 16 February 2006) was an Italian basketball player. He competed in the 1936 Summer Olympics.

References

External links
 

1909 births
2006 deaths
Italian men's basketball players
Olympic basketball players of Italy
Basketball players at the 1936 Summer Olympics